Kenyarctia occidentalis is a moth in the family Erebidae. It was described by Max Bartel in 1903. It is found in Namibia and South Africa.

References

Natural History Museum Lepidoptera generic names catalog

Moths described in 1903
Spilosomina